Eva-Lis Wuorio (12 November 1918 – 1988 in Ruovesi) was a Finnish-born writer. She was born in Viipuri, Finland and her family emigrated to Canada, where she was educated. She later moved to the Channel Islands. She wrote principally for children and young adults.

Bibliography
 Return of the Viking, Eau Claire, Wisconsin: E. M. Hale and Company, 1955
 The Canadian Twins (illustrated by Biro), Jonathan Cape, 1956
 The Island of Fish in the Trees (illustrated by Edward Ardizzone), Cleveland and New York: The World Publishing Company, 1962
 The Woman with the Portuguese Basket, New York: Holt, Rinehart and Winston, 1963
 The Land of Right Up and Down (illustrated by Edward Ardizzone), Cleveland and New York: The World Publishing Company, 1964
 The Terror Factor, New York: Lancer Books, 1965
 Tal and the Magic Barruget (illustrated by Bettina), Cleveland and New York: The World Publishing Company, 1965
 Z for Zaborra, New York: Holt, Rinehart and Winston, 1965
 October Treasure, New York: Holt, Rinehart and Winston, 1966
 Midsummer Lokki, New York: Holt, Rinehart and Winston, 1966 (also published as Explosion!)
 Venture at Midsummer, New York: Holt, Rinehart and Winston, 1967
 Forbidden Adventure, London: Ronald Whiting & Wheaton, 1967
 Kali and the Golden Mirror (illustrated by Edward Ardizzone), Cleveland and New York: The World Publishing Company, 1967 
 Save Alice!, New York: Holt, Rinehart and Winston, 1968 
 The Happiness Flower, (illustrated by Don Bolognese), Cleveland and New York: The World Publishing Company, 1969
 The Singing Canoe (illustrated by Irving Boker), Cleveland and New York: The World Publishing Company, 1969
 Code: Polonaise, New York: Holt, Rinehart and Winston, 1971
 To Fight in Silence, New York: Holt, Rinehart and Winston, 1973
 Escape If You Can: 13 Tales of the Preternatural, The Viking Press, 1977
 Detour to Danger New York: Delacorte Press, 1981

See also

References

External links
 Biography from the Finnish North American Literature Association 

1918 births
Canadian writers of young adult literature
Finnish emigrants to Canada
1988 deaths
Finnish children's writers
Finnish women children's writers
Finnish expatriates in England
Canadian women children's writers
20th-century Canadian women writers
Canadian emigrants to England
Canadian expatriates in England